Hohenlohe-Kirchberg was a German County located in northeastern Baden-Württemberg, Germany, around Kirchberg. It was ruled by a protestant branch of the Hohenlohe family. 

The county of Kirchberg was located between the territories of Brandenburg-Ansbach to the north and east, the Free City of Schwäbisch Hall to the south, and Langenburg (ruled by Hohenlohe-Langenburg) to the west. Hohenlohe-Kirchberg was a partition of Hohenlohe-Langenburg. It was raised from a County to a Principality in 1764, was mediatised to Bavaria in 1806, and was traded to Württemberg in 1810.

The Hohenlohe-Kirchberg branch extinguished in 1861 and the castle with its lands was inherited by the princes of Hohenlohe-Oehringen, residing at Öhringen and Neuenstein. The castle was sold to a protestant old age home foundation in 1952.

Counts of Hohenlohe-Kirchberg (1701–1764)
Frederick Eberhard (Count of Hohenlohe-Langenburg) (1701–1737)
Charles Augustus (1737–1764)

Princes of Hohenlohe-Kirchberg (1764–1806)
Charles Augustus (1764–1767)
Christian Frederick Charles (1767–1806)
Friedrich Wilhelm, Fürst zu Hohenlohe-Kirchberg (3 December 1732 – 10 August 1796)

Counties of the Holy Roman Empire